The Prior of St Andrews was the head of the property and community of Augustinian canons of St Andrews Cathedral Priory, St Andrews, Fife, Scotland. It was established by King David I in 1140 with canons from Nostell Priory, West Yorkshire. It is possible that, initially at least, the prior of St Andrews was subordinate to the bishop as abbot, but by the 13th century the canons of St Andrews were given freedom by the bishop to elect their prior. By the end of the 13th century, the abbacy of the native canons (i.e. the Céli Dé, or Culdees) was no longer there to challenge the position of the priory, and the native canons themselves had been formed into a collegiate church.

The position of prior became secularized and the priory itself carved up into lordships in the 16th century, although the core and title remained into the 17th century. The following is a  list of known priors and commendators:

List of priors
 Robert I, 1140x1144-1160
 Walter I, 1160-1195
 Gilbert I, 1198
 Walter I (again), 1198x1199
 Thomas I, 1199-1211
 Simon, 1212-1225
 Henry de Norham, x 1228-1236
 John White, 1236-1258
 Gilbert, 1258-1264
 John de Haddington, 1264-1304
 Adam Mauchan, 1304-1313
 John de Forfar, 1313-1321
 John de Cowrie, 1321-1340
 William de Lothian, 1340-1354
 Thomas Biset, 1354-1363
 Stephen de Pa, 1363-1386
 Robert de Montrose, 1386x1387-1394
 James Biset, 1394-1416
 William de Camera, 1416-1417 
 John Bullock, (claimed) 1417-1418 
 James de Haldeston, 1417-1443
 John Litstar (unfruitful provision), 1417-1418
 William Bonar, 1443-1462
 David Ramsay, 1466-1469
 Walter Monypenny, 1467-1468
 William Cameron, 1469-1482
 Walter Monypenny, 1469
 John Wallace, 1469-1471 
 Thomas Ruch, 1475
 Walter Monypenny, 1483-1486
 John Hepburn, 1483-1526
 Patrick Hepburn, 1524-1538

List of commendators
 James Stewart, 1538-1570
 Robert Stewart, 1570-1586
 Ludovic, Duke of Lennox, 1586-1624

See also
 Bishop of St Andrews

Notes

Bibliography
 Barrow, G.W.S., "The Clergy at St Andrews", in G.W.S. Barrow (ed.), The Kingdom of the Scots, (Edinburgh, 2003), pp. 189–202
 Cowan, Ian B. & Easson, David E., Medieval Religious Houses: Scotland With an Appendix on the Houses in the Isle of Man, Second Edition, (London, 1976), p. 96
 Duncan, A.A.M., "The Foundation of St Andrews Cathedral Priory, 1140", in The Scottish Historical Review, vol 84, (April, 2005), pp. 1–37
 Watt, D.E.R. & Shead, N.F. (eds.), The Heads of Religious Houses in Scotland from the 12th to the 16th Centuries, The Scottish Records Society, New Series, Volume 24, (Edinburgh, 2001), pp. 187–92

 *
Saint Andrews
Saint Andrews